The Matrimonial Causes Act 1973 (c 18) is an Act of Parliament of the United Kingdom governing divorce law and marriage in England and Wales.

Contents

The act contains four parts: 
 Divorce, Nullity and Other Matrimonial Suits
 Financial Relief for Parties to Marriage and Children of Family
 Protection, Custody, etc., of Children
 Miscellaneous and Supplemental

Section 1 sets out the grounds that must be demonstrated before a divorce can be granted. These five grounds were adultery, behaving "in such a way that the petitioner cannot reasonably be expected to live", desertion for two years, two years of separation with the consent of the parties, or five years of separation. Following the decision of the Supreme Court of the United Kingdom in Owens v Owens, Parliament passed the Divorce, Dissolution and Separation Act 2020, which has removed these conditions.

Section 13 provides for certain restrictions in regard to the possibility of annulling voidable marriages, including where the petitioner knew of the "defect" and of the possibility of annulment, but induced the respondent to believe that s/he would not seek an annulment; or where it would be "unjust" to the respondent to grant the decree of nullity. There is usually a time limit of three years from the date of the marriage in order to institute the proceedings.

Under section 24(1), when granting a divorce, decree of nullity of marriage or judicial separation the court can order (subject to restrictions in ss 29(1) and (3) relating to children of the age of majority other than those still in school or in other special circumstances):

(a) the transfer of property between the parties, or to a child, or for the benefit of a child
(b) the settlement of property for the partner and children
(c) the variation of any ante-nuptial or post-nuptial settlement other than a pension
(d) the extinguishment or reduction of the interest of the parties to any settlement other than a pension

Under s. 24(2), the court can make an order under s. 24(1)(c) even if there are no children, and under s. 24(3) orders and settlements take effect only when the divorce or nullity of marriage is made absolute.

See also
Ahkter v Khan
English land law
English property law

References

Further reading
 Lawrence Stone. Road to Divorce: England 1530-1987 (1990)

United Kingdom Acts of Parliament 1973
Divorce law in the United Kingdom